Doctors' Hospital is an American medical drama that ran on NBC during the 1975–1976 season.

Synopsis
The series follows the neurosurgery team at the fictional Lowell Memorial Hospital in Los Angeles, led by Dr. Jake Goodwin (George Peppard) and his staff, including residents Norah Purcell (Zohra Lampert), and Felipe Ortega (Victor Campos), and nurse Hestor Stanton (Adrian Ricard). Other cast members included John Larroquette and John Pleshette.  Toward the end of the season, Peppard announced that he did not wish to continue in his role on the series.  Producers reportedly wanted to retool the series and make Lampert's character the central figure, but NBC did not feel the actress had the name recognition to carry the show (despite the fact that she had just won an Emmy for a guest appearance on an episode of Kojak), and decided to cancel the series.

Though it lasted only one season, the series was noted for injecting a sense of realism not otherwise seen in medical shows of the day (e.g. Marcus Welby, M.D., Ben Casey).  It has often been cited as setting a tone that later shows like St. Elsewhere, ER, and Chicago Hope would expand on.

Episodes

References

External links
 
Doctors Hospital at CVTA

1970s American medical television series
1970s American drama television series
NBC original programming
Television series by Universal Television
1975 American television series debuts
1976 American television series endings
Television shows set in Los Angeles
English-language television shows